The Westchester Film Festival  (or Westchester County Film Festival) is an annual film festival held in Westchester County, New York, United States. It is a non-profit organization. The festival features premieres and screenings of new, independent films. It screens dramatic and documentary feature films, international films, short films and student films and presents Jury and Audience awards in many categories.

Controversy 
The festival's selection criteria came under fire in February 2007 when Westchester filmmaker John Fitzgerald accused the festival jury of a dishonest film selection process. In an email exchange with festival director Iris Stevens, Fitzgerald contended that his film had a strong Westchester connection with all nine crew members hailing from Westchester County as well as numerous positive reviews. He pointed out that his film The Emerald Diamond - a documentary about the Irish National Baseball Team - had been positively reviewed by numerous media outlets including The New York Times and National Public Radio, yet it somehow was not up to the small festival's standards. In her reply, Stevens indicated that one of the accepted documentaries (DeMatteo) had initially been rejected by the jury, but was given a special screening because the film had connections in the Westchester County Film Office, thus proving the festival's confusingly political selection process. Fitzgerald countered by requesting a similar special screening for The Emerald Diamond, given its strong ties to Westchester County and the local publicity that would be generated for the festival, given that it was to be held in the week before St. Patrick's Day. The festival declined.

Film festivals in New York (state)
Film festival